Maurizio Zonzini (born 20 March 1962) is a Sammarinese gymnast. He competed in seven events at the 1984 Summer Olympics.

References

1962 births
Living people
Sammarinese male artistic gymnasts
Olympic gymnasts of San Marino
Gymnasts at the 1984 Summer Olympics
Place of birth missing (living people)